Kadyrotar (Q̇edi-Otar) is a rural locality (a selo) in Adilotarsky Selsoviet, Khasavyurtovsky District, Republic of Dagestan, Russia. The population was 807 as of 2010. There are 17 streets.

Geography 
Kadyrotar is located 26 km north of Khasavyurt (the district's administrative centre) by road. Adilotar is the nearest rural locality.

References 

Rural localities in Khasavyurtovsky District